Michael Irwin Jordan  (born February 25, 1956) is an American scientist, professor at the University of California, Berkeley and researcher in machine learning, statistics, and artificial intelligence. 

Jordan was elected a member of the National Academy of Engineering in 2010 for contributions to the foundations and applications of machine learning.

He is one of the leading figures in machine learning, and in 2016 Science reported him as the world's most influential computer scientist.

In 2022, Jordan won the inaugural WLA Prize in Computer Science or Mathematics, "for fundamental contributions to the foundations of machine learning and its application."

Education 
Jordan received his BS magna cum laude in Psychology in 1978 from the Louisiana State University, his MS in Mathematics in 1980 from Arizona State University and his PhD in Cognitive Science in 1985 from the University of California, San Diego. At the University of California, San Diego, Jordan was a student of David Rumelhart and a member of the Parallel Distributed Processing (PDP) Group in the 1980s.

Career and research
Jordan is the Pehong Chen Distinguished Professor at the University of California, Berkeley, where his appointment is split across EECS and Statistics. He was a professor at the Department of Brain and Cognitive Sciences at MIT from 1988 to 1998.

In the 1980s Jordan started developing recurrent neural networks as a cognitive model. In recent years, his work is less driven from a cognitive perspective and more from the background of traditional statistics.

Jordan popularised Bayesian networks in the machine learning community and is known for pointing out links between machine learning and statistics. He was also prominent in the formalisation of variational methods for approximate inference and the popularisation of the expectation–maximization algorithm in machine learning.

Resignation from Machine Learning
In 2001, Jordan and others resigned from the editorial board of the journal Machine Learning. In a public letter, they argued for less restrictive access and pledged support for a new open access journal, the Journal of Machine Learning Research, which was created by Leslie Kaelbling to support the evolution of the field of machine learning.

Honors and awards
Jordan has received numerous awards, including a best student paper award (with X. Nguyen and M. Wainwright) at the International Conference on Machine Learning (ICML 2004), a best paper award (with R. Jacobs) at the American Control Conference (ACC 1991), the ACM-AAAI Allen Newell Award, the IEEE Neural Networks Pioneer Award, and an NSF Presidential Young Investigator Award. In 2002 he was named an AAAI Fellow "for significant contributions to reasoning under uncertainty, machine learning, and human motor control." In 2004 he was named an IMS Fellow "for contributions to graphical models and machine learning." In 2005 he was named an IEEE Fellow "for contributions to probabilistic graphical models and neural information processing systems." In 2007 he was named an ASA Fellow. In 2010 he was named a Cognitive Science Society Fellow and named an ACM Fellow "for contributions to the theory and application of machine learning." In 2012 he was named a SIAM Fellow "for contributions to machine learning, in particular variational approaches to statistical inference." In 2014 he was named an International Society for Bayesian Analysis Fellow "for his outstanding research contributions at the interface of statistics, computer sciences and probability, for his leading role in promoting Bayesian methods in machine learning, engineering and other fields, and for his extensive service to ISBA in many roles."

Jordan is a member of the National Academy of Sciences, a member of the National Academy of Engineering and a member of the American Academy of Arts and Sciences.

He has been named a Neyman Lecturer and a Medallion Lecturer by the Institute of Mathematical Statistics. He received the David E. Rumelhart Prize in 2015 and the ACM/AAAI Allen Newell Award in 2009. He also won 2020 IEEE John von Neumann Medal.

In 2016, Jordan was identified as the "most influential computer scientist", based on an analysis of the published literature by the Semantic Scholar project.

In 2019, Jordan argued that the artificial intelligence revolution hasn't happened yet and that the AI revolution required a blending of computer science with statistics.

In 2022, Jordan was awarded the inaugural WLA Prize by non-governmental and non-profit international organization World Laureates Association, for fundamental contributions to the foundations of machine learning and its application.

References

1956 births
Living people
Artificial intelligence researchers
Machine learning researchers
University of California, San Diego alumni
Fellows of the American Statistical Association
Fellows of the Association for the Advancement of Artificial Intelligence
UC Berkeley College of Engineering faculty
Place of birth missing (living people)
Fellows of the Association for Computing Machinery
Members of the United States National Academy of Sciences
Fellows of the American Academy of Arts and Sciences
Members of the United States National Academy of Engineering
Rumelhart Prize laureates
Fellows of the Society for Industrial and Applied Mathematics
Fellows of the Cognitive Science Society